The autoignition temperature or self-ignition temperature, often called spontaneous ignition temperature or minimum ignition temperature (or shortly ignition temperature) and formerly also known as kindling point, of a substance is the lowest temperature in which it spontaneously ignites in a normal atmosphere without an external source of ignition, such as a flame or spark. This temperature is required to supply the activation energy needed for combustion. The temperature at which a chemical ignites decreases as the pressure is increased. 

Substances which spontaneously ignite in a normal atmosphere at naturally ambient temperatures are termed pyrophoric.

Autoignition temperatures of liquid chemicals are typically measured using a  flask placed in a temperature-controlled oven in accordance with the procedure described in ASTM E659.

When measured for plastics, autoignition temperature can be also  measured under elevated pressure and at 100% oxygen concentration. The resulting value is used as a predictor of viability for high-oxygen service. The main testing standard for this is ASTM G72.

Autoignition time equation
The time  it takes for a material to reach its autoignition temperature  when exposed to a heat flux  is given by the following equation:

where k = thermal conductivity, ρ = density, and c = specific heat capacity of the material of interest,  is the initial temperature of the material (or the temperature of the bulk material).

Autoignition temperature of selected substances
Temperatures vary widely in the literature and should only be used as estimates. Factors that may cause variation include partial pressure of oxygen, altitude, humidity, and amount of time required for ignition. Generally the autoignition temperature for hydrocarbon/air mixtures decreases with increasing molecular mass and increasing chain length. The autoignition temperature is also higher for branched-chain hydrocarbons than for straight-chain hydrocarbons.

See also
 Fire point
 Flash point
 Gas burner (for flame temperatures, combustion heat energy values and ignition temperatures)
 Spontaneous combustion

References

External links 
 Analysis of Effective Thermal Properties of Thermally Thick Materials.

Chemical properties
Fire
Threshold temperatures

sv:Självantändning#Självantändningspunkt